Lalouette is a surname. Notable people with the surname include:

Claire Lalouette, French Egyptologist
Éric Lalouette (born 1951), French racing cyclist
Jean-François Lalouette (1651–1728), French composer
Kévin Lalouette (born 1984), French road and track cyclist
Pierre Lalouette (1711–1792), French anatomist

See also 
Lalouette's pyramid, Thyroid